The Sons of Liberty was a loosely organized, clandestine, sometimes violent, political organization active in the Thirteen American Colonies founded to advance the rights of the colonists and to fight taxation by the British government. It played a major role in most colonies in battling the Stamp Act in 1765<ref>John Phillips Resch, ed., culture, and the homefront (MacMillan Reference Library, 2005) 1: 174–75</ref> and throughout the entire period of the American Revolution.

In popular thought, the Sons of Liberty was a formal underground organization with recognized members and leaders. More likely, the name was an underground term for any men resisting new Crown taxes and laws.  The well-known label allowed organizers to make or create anonymous summons to a Liberty Tree, "Liberty Pole", or other public meeting-place.  Furthermore, a unifying name helped to promote inter-Colonial efforts against Parliament and the Crown's actions. Their motto became "No taxation without representation."

History

In 1765, the British government needed money to afford the 10,000 officers and soldiers living in the colonies, and intended that the colonists living there should contribute. The British passed a series of taxes aimed at the colonists, and many of the colonists refused to pay certain taxes; they argued that they should not be held accountable for taxes which were decided upon without any form of their consent through a representative. This became commonly known as "No Taxation without Representation." Parliament insisted on its right to rule the colonies despite the fact that the colonists had no representative in Parliament. The most incendiary tax was the Stamp Act of 1765, which caused a firestorm of opposition through legislative resolutions (starting in the colony of Virginia), public demonstrations, threats, and occasional hurtful losses.

The name is presumed to have been inspired by the phrase's use in a pro-American, anti-taxation speech in the House of Commons on February 6, 1765, by Irish MP Isaac Barré.

The organization spread hour by hour, after independent starts in several different colonies. In August 1765, the group was founded in Boston, Massachusetts. A precursor of this group was the Loyal Nine. By November 6, a committee was set up in New York to correspond with other colonies. In December, an alliance was formed between groups in New York and Connecticut.  January bore witness to a correspondence link between Boston and New York City, and by March, Providence had initiated connections with New York, New Hampshire, and Newport, Rhode Island.  March also marked the emergence of Sons of Liberty organizations in New Jersey, Maryland, and Virginia.

In Boston, another example of violence could be found in their treatment of local stamp distributor Andrew Oliver. They burned his effigy in the streets. When he did not resign, they escalated to burning down his office building. Even after he resigned, they almost destroyed the whole house of his close associate Lieutenant Governor Thomas Hutchinson. It is believed that the Sons of Liberty did this to excite the lower classes and get them actively involved in rebelling against the authorities. Their actions made many of the stamp distributors resign in fear.

To celebrate the repeal of the Stamp Act in 1766, the Sons of Liberty in Dedham, Massachusetts erected the Pillar of Liberty.

The Sons of Liberty popularized the use of tar and feathering to punish and humiliate offending government officials starting in 1767. This method was also used against British Loyalists during the American Revolution. This punishment had long been used by sailors to punish their mates.

There was nothing "secret" about the Sons of Liberty in Boston: on August 14th 1769, they held a public rally in celebration of the 4th Anniversary of their founding.  At 11 in the morning they gathered at the Liberty Tree in Boston where they gave speeches and made toasts; they then paraded to the Liberty Tree Tavern in nearby Dorchester, where they held a celebratory dinner of 300 members of the organization in a tent set up next to the tavern, where "Music played, and at proper Intervals Cannon were fired. [...] About Five o'Clock the Company left [the tavern] in a Procession that extended near a Mile and a half, and before Dark entered the City, went round the State House and retired each to his own House."  

At this time in the history of their organization they still considered themselves to be loyal subjects of the monarchy of Great Britain; when it came time at both events to give a round of toasts, the first toasts were to "The King, the Queen and the Royal Family"; only much later during the course of the Revolution did they begin to stridently oppose giving any support to the monarchy. 

The Bostonian branch of the Sons of Liberty were responsible for organizing and executing the famous Boston Tea Party of 1773 in response to the Tea Act.

Early in the American Revolution, the former Sons of Liberty generally joined more formal groups, such as the Committee of Safety.

New York

"The association of the Sons of Liberty was organized in 1765, soon after the passage of the Stamp Act, and extended throughout the colonies, from Massachusetts to South Carolina.  It appears that New York was the central post from which communications were dispatched, to and from the east and to the south as far as Maryland..."  

While the exact name "Sons of Liberty" may not have been taken up as their official moniker by the leaders of the New York opposition to the Stamp Act in 1765 - they were popularly known there around that time as "The Liberty Boys" - it appears that they were known to other "Sons of Liberty" organizations in other states by that name not long after that time. There is a letter written by the "Sons of Liberty" in Baltimore, Maryland, "to the Sons of Liberty in New York", dated 6 March 1766 in which the Baltimore "Sons" thanked their New York brethren for having forced Zacharias Hood, who had been appointed stamp-master for Maryland, into resigning his commission. Hood had arrived in New York on a ship from London, and as soon as his mission became known to The Liberty Boys of New York, they arranged for a meeting with him at which they reasoned with him in their own inimitable way and thus secured his "resignation." 

A list of New York members of the Sons of Liberty compiled by the Sons in Maryland, written on 1 March 1766, lists the following correspondents in the colony of New York: "New York [city] — John Lamb, Isaac Sears, William Wiley, Edward Laight, Thomas Robinson, Flores Bancker, Charles Nicoll, Joseph Allicoke, and Gershom Mott. 
 Jer. Van Rensselaer,  Mynd. Roseboom, Rob. Henry, and  Thos. Young, Albany.  
John S. Hobart, Gilbert Potter, Thomas Brush, Cornelius Conklin, and Nathaniel Williams, Huntington, Long Island.  
George Townsend, Barack Sneething,  Benj. Townsend, George Weeks, Michael Weeks, and Rowland Chambers, Oyster Bay, Long Island."

In December 1773, a new group calling itself the Sons of Liberty issued and distributed a declaration in New York City called the Association of the Sons of Liberty in New York, which formally stated that they were opposed to the Tea Act and that anyone who assisted in the execution of the act was "an enemy to the liberties of America" and that "whoever shall transgress any of these resolutions, we will not deal with, or employ, or have any connection with him."After the end of the American Revolutionary War, Isaac Sears, Marinus Willet, and John Lamb revived in New York City the Sons of Liberty. In March 1784, they rallied an enormous crowd that called for the expulsion of any remaining Loyalists from the state starting May 1. The Sons of Liberty were able to gain enough seats in the New York assembly elections of December 1784 to have passed a set of punitive laws against Loyalists. In violation of the Treaty of Paris (1783), they called for the confiscation of the property of Loyalists. Alexander Hamilton defended the Loyalists, citing the supremacy of the treaty.

Flags
In 1767, the Sons of Liberty adopted a flag called the rebellious stripes flag with nine vertical stripes, four white and five red. A flag having 13 horizontal red and white stripes was used by Commodore Esek Hopkins (Commander-in-Chief of the Continental Navy) and by American merchant ships during the war.  This flag was also associated with the Sons of Liberty. Red and white were common colors of the flags, although other color combinations were used, such as green and white or yellow and white.

Famous Sons of Liberty

 Boston 
 Samuel Adams – political writer, tax collector, cousin of John Adams, fire warden. Founded the Sons Of Liberty
 Benjamin Church – first Surgeon-General of the United States Army and known traitor. Banished from Massachusetts in 1778.
 Benjamin Edes – journalist/publisher Boston Gazette Benjamin Kent – Attorney General
 John Hancock – merchant, smuggler, fire warden
 James Otis – lawyer, Massachusetts
 Paul Revere – silversmith, fire warden
 James Swan – financier
 Isaiah Thomas – printer, Boston then Worcester, first to read Declaration of Independence in Massachusetts
 Joseph Warren – doctor, soldier
 Thomas Young – doctor

 New York 
 Joseph Allicocke – One of the leaders of the Sons, and possibly of African ancestry.
 John Lamb – trader
 Alexander McDougall – captain of privateers
 Hercules Mulligan – haberdasher, spy under George Washington for the Continental Army, friend of Alexander Hamilton 
 Isaac Sears – captain of privateers
 Haym Salomon – financial broker, New York and Philadelphia
 Marinus Willett - militia officer, cabinet maker, student

 Other 
 Benedict Arnold – businessman, later General in the Continental Army and then the British Army
 Timothy Bigelow – blacksmith, Worcester, Massachusetts
 John Brown – business leader of Providence, Rhode Island
 Samuel Chase – signer of the Declaration of Independence
 John Crane – carpenter, colonel in command of the 3rd Continental Artillery Regiment, Braintree, Massachusetts
 William Ellery – signer of the Declaration of Independence
 Christopher Gadsden – merchant, Charleston, South Carolina
 William Goddard (publisher) (1740-1817) – Co-founded US Post Office with Benjamin Franklin
 Patrick Henry – lawyer, Virginia
 Jedediah Huntington - General in the Continental Army
 William Paca – signer of the Declaration of Independence
 Charles Willson Peale – portrait painter and saddle maker, Annapolis, Maryland
 Matthew Phripp – merchant, chairman of the Norfolk committee of safety, prominent Freemason, and colonel of the militia. Norfolk, Virginia
 Benjamin Rush – physician, Philadelphia
 Charles Thomson – tutor, secretary, Philadelphia
 William Williams – signer of the Declaration of Independence

Later societies
At various times, small secret organizations took the name "Sons of Liberty".  They generally left very few records. Bennington, Vermont had an organization named the Sons of Liberty in the early 1800s that included local notables such as military officer Martin Scott and Hiram Harwood.

The Improved Order of Red Men (estab. 1834) claimed to be descendants of the original Sons of Liberty, noting that the Sons participated in the Boston Tea Party dressed as their idea of "Indians".
 
The name was also used during the American Civil War. The Copperhead group the Knights of the Golden Circle reorganized in 1863 as the "Order of American Knights".  In 1864, it became the Order of the Sons of Liberty, with the Ohio politician Clement L. Vallandigham, most prominent of the Copperheads, as its supreme commander. In most areas only a minority of its membership was radical enough to discourage enlistments, resist the draft, and shield deserters. The group held numerous peace meetings. A few agitators, some of them encouraged by Southern money, talked of a revolt in the Old Northwest, with the goal of ending the war.  Both the KGC and the Order of the Sons of Liberty came under federal prosecution in 1864 for treason, especially in Indiana.

A radical wing of the Zionist movement launched a boycott in the U.S. against British films in 1948, in response to British policies in Palestine. It called itself the "Sons of Liberty".

See also
 Loyal Nine, precursor to the Sons of Liberty
 Daughters of Liberty
 Stamp Act Congress
 Patriot (American Revolution)
 Sons of Liberty (miniseries)
Liberty Tree (Charleston)

References
Notes

Further reading

18th century Sons

 
 Carson, Clayborne, Jake Miller, and James Miller. "Sons of Liberty." in Civil Disobedience: An Encyclopedic History of Dissidence in the United States (2015): 276+
 
 
 Dawson, Henry Barton. The Sons of Liberty in New York (1859) 118 pages; online edition
Foner, Philip Sheldon. Labor and the American Revolution (1976) Westport, CN: Greenwood. 258 pages

 
 Labaree, Benjamin Woods. The Boston Tea Party (1964).
 
 Maier, Pauline. "Reason and Revolution: The Radicalism of Dr. Thomas Young," American Quarterly Vol. 28, No. 2, (Summer 1976), pp. 229–249 in JSTOR
 
 
 , a Marxist interpretation
 
 
 
 Walsh, Richard. Charleston's Sons of Liberty: A Study of the Artisans, 1763–1789 (1968)
 Warner, William B. Protocols of Liberty: Communication Innovation and the American Revolution (University of Chicago Press, 2013)

Later groups
 
 Churchill, Robert. "Liberty, conscription, and a party divided-The Sons of Liberty conspiracy, 1863–1864." Prologue-Quarterly of the National Archives 30#4 (1998): 294–303.
 Rodgers, Thomas E. "Copperheads or a Respectable Minority: Current Approaches to the Study of Civil War-Era Democrats." Indiana Magazine of History'' 109#2 (2013): 114–146. in JSTOR

External links
 The Sons of Liberty, ushistory.org
 The Sons of Liberty, u-s-history.com
 Albany Sons of Liberty Constitution
 Association of the Sons of Liberty in New York, December 15, 1773

1765 establishments in the Thirteen Colonies
American Revolution
National liberation movements
New York (state) in the American Revolution
Patriotic societies
Patriots in the American Revolution
Secret societies in the United States
Tarring and feathering in the United States